Time is the 44th album by Ray Price, released by Audium Records, August 27, 2002.

Critical reception

Jim Smith of AllMusic writes, "Price is in excellent voice, astonishingly so at times, and it's a genuine pleasure to hear how well his talent has endured, even well into his seventh decade."

Jerry Renshaw reviews the album for The Austin Chronicle and gives it 3½ stars. He concludes his review by saying, "If you listen to his version of Howard's "What If I Say Goodbye" and don't feel a twinge, then you might want to make sure there's not a dead fish where your heart ought to be."

Track listing

Track information and credits adapted from the album's liner notes.

Personnel

Harold Bradley – acoustic guitar, bass guitar
Buddy Harman – drums
Bob Moore – bass
Jimmy Capps – acoustic guitar
Buddy Emmons – steel guitar
Pete Wade – electric guitar
David Briggs – piano, keyboards
Rob Hajacos – fiddle
Joe Caverlee – fiddle
Buddy Jewell – harmony vocals
Lisa Stewart – harmony vocals
Greg Cole – harmony vocals
Vince Gill – harmony vocals on "What If I Say Goodbye"

Production

Fred Foster – Producer
Billy Sherrill – Engineer
Drew Bollman – Engineering Assistant
Jeff Chenault – Art Direction & Design
Nancy Lee Andrews – Photography
Emmy Harris – Grooming/Styling

References

2002 albums
Ray Price (musician) albums
Albums produced by Fred Foster
Country albums by American artists